Restrepia contorta, the twisted restrepia, is a species of orchid endemic to western South America.

contorta